"My Friend" is a song performed by Croatian singer Jacques Houdek. The song represented Croatia in the Eurovision Song Contest 2017. It was released as a digital download on 2 March 2017, and is the first Croatian entry to contain lyrics in the Italian language. Houdek alternates between singing in Italian using his chest register and in English using his head and falsetto registers.

Eurovision Song Contest

On 17 February 2017, Houdek was announced as the Croatian entrant to the Eurovision Song Contest 2017. On 20 February, it was confirmed that the song he'd be singing was called "My Friend". The song was later released on 2 March. Croatia competed in the second half of the second semi-final at the Eurovision Song Contest.

Track listing

Charts

Weekly charts

Release history

References

Eurovision songs of Croatia
Eurovision songs of 2017
2017 songs
2017 singles
Italian-language songs
Songs about friendship